PopPixie is an Italian animated miniseries created by Iginio Straffi. Its only season aired on Rai 2 for just over two months, from 10 January to 22 March 2011. The show features a cast of pixies, who were first introduced as secondary characters in the second season of Winx Club. PopPixie is aimed at younger viewers, with an intended audience of 4 to 6-year-olds.

The miniseries was first announced in May 2009, and its first episode was previewed at MIPCOM. After Nickelodeon became a co-developer of the main Winx Club series, the company announced that PopPixie would air on its global network of channels beginning in late 2011.

PopPixie is set in a small town called Pixieville, inhabited by creatures like pixies, elves, and gnomes. The town is fed from the Tree of Life, an ancient tree that provides the Pixies' MagicPops, globes that contain good magic related to a pixie's special talent. Each Pixie has a special talent and when they use it for the benefit of others and in the right way, they will receive a MagicPop and becomes a PopPixie.

Characters

Pixies
Lockette: Her MagicPop gives her the power to open magical passages and find everything which is hidden. She is the Pixie of Direction. She works at the Pixie Plaza, the most famous hotel in Pixieville.
Caramel: She runs the most famous bakery in Pixieville, the Molly Moo, and her MagicPop gives her incredible strength. She is the Pixie of Super Strength and the twin sister of Martino.
Martino: He is the barman at the Molly Moo, his twin sister Caramel's bakery. His MagicPop gives him the power of doing incredible acrobatics, balancing and extraordinary strength. He is the Pixie of Acrobatics.
Amore: She owns the Love Shop, which is the only shop to be specialized in love potions and spells in Pixieville. She is the Pixie of Feelings. Amore's love interest is Robinson, Pixieville's ranger.
Chatta: Chatta is the Pixie of Gossip, and uses her gossip as a means of defending herself as well as of attacking her enemies.
Cherie: She is the richest pixie of Pixieville, and is the Pixie of Weather. Her MagicPop gives her the power of controlling the weather when she is happy, sad, or angry.
Fixit: He is the Pixie of Technomagic, and works at the Toy Shop of the Gnome Augustus, where he uses his talent to make incredible toys. His MagicPop gives him extraordinary intelligence which he uses to make unique inventions combining magic and Technomagic.
Digit: He is also the Pixie of Technomagic. His MagicPop gives him the power to using Technology. Digit was changed to a boy in PopPixie.
Livy: He is the Pixie of Messages in Winx Club, but in PopPixie, his MagicPop gives him the ability to be super fast. Livy was changed to a boy as well. He is the Pixie of Velocity.
Pam: She works at the most famous beauty salon in Pixieville. Her MagicPop makes it very fast. Her assistant is a hedgehog named Bamboo. She is the Pixie of Hand Speed.
Piff: She is the Pixie of Sweet Sleep, and has a rabbit for companion. She is able to talk, unlike the second season of Winx Club, where she only makes noises.
Glim: Like Piff, Glim is a baby and can't talk. His suit lights up when he wants, resembling a firefly. In PopPixie, Glim is a boy and his MagicPop grants him the power to manipulate electrokinesis. He is the Pixie of Energy.
Tune: She is the Pixie of Vocal Power and her MagicPop gives her the power to be good and to even cry very sharply.
Kara: She is the Pop Pixie of Creation. With a swipe of her paint brush, she can create almost anything. Her brother is Pixienardo and best and childhood friend is Chatta, the Pop Pixie of Gossip.
Ranger Robinson: He is Pixieville's park ranger and Amore's love interest. Robinson knows a lot about animals and wildlife.
Camilla is the shy little pixie, who has invisible power but also sweet. After she defeated Damien the little elf, she's got the MagicPop that turns her into PopPixie of Illusion.
Roxie is a pixie with 4 ponytails on the sides of her hair, and her best friend is Mina and Daisy, and she loves it when Martino do the back flip and acrobatic cocktails.
Mina is the Pixie who has a star shirt and purple pants, and brown hair.
Lala is the pixie with 2 ponytails, and she's not into Justin Nimble, she's grouchy sometimes. But she also like Martino doing an acrobatic show.
Camelia is the PopPixie of plants. She loves plants, and likes to hang out with her friends, and she's the helpful, caring pixie in the world. 
Flower is the pixie who doesn't like Chatta at first, because Chatta made spilt coffee all over her. But in the end, Flower thanked her for saving the day after she wrote an article. 
Fifi Doesn't like Martino flirting with girls, and then Dr. Boxen advice her to help them shut down Molly Moo's. Fifi has a friend named Lila with space bun hair up and half down.

Elves
Floxy is an Elf with a special talent for spiteful tricks and bad jokes. He is not particularly intelligent and is the most immature of the Elves. There is nothing that he takes seriously and since his organisational skills are nil, he follows Rex faithfully. Floxy is both lazy and greedy. He loves cakes more than money.
Narcissa is equally lazy and quirky. She dreams of living the life of a great lady, something that Floxy cannot give her. Narcissa pushes Floxy to be better than the others and this often lands her fiancé in situations that she doesn't know how to get out of. For Narcissa this is a very painful situation and she reacts in all the wrong ways, feeling inferior to her friends who have better male partners than she has.
Lenny is wacky and loves taking risks for the sake of excitement, reckless and irresponsible. Although he is unpredictable and independent, he is always the first to follow Rex and Yucca in some new raid on Pixieville.
Yucca is the fiancé of Lenny. Yucca is frivolous and adores extreme shopping.
Rex is an arrogant and haughty elf. He admires Maxine and thinks that the rest of the world is not worthy of his attention. Compared to the others, Rex has a more mature and criminal side to his character. This aspect of his character particularly appeals to Maxine, his fiancé who is very ambitious.
Maxine is very malicious and is the dominating personality of the couple with Rex. As the meanie of the elves, she uses all her charm to keep Rex firmly where she wants him. As Rex is a model for the boy Elves, Maxine is the role model for girl Elves.

Other characters
Aside from Pixies, Pixieville is also home to gnomes and talking animals who help the Pixies.

Episodes

References

External links
 Official website
 Poppixie at Nick.co.uk

Winx Club
2010s Italian television series
2011 Italian television series debuts
2010s animated television series
Animated television series about children
Italian children's animated adventure television series
Italian children's animated fantasy television series
Anime-influenced Western animated television series
Television series by Rainbow S.r.l.
Television series created by Iginio Straffi
Fairies and sprites in popular culture
Pixies